Paterson is a rural locality in the Fraser Coast Region, Queensland, Australia.

History 
The locality presumably takes its name from its railway station which in turn was named after a local resident. Local residents began lobbying for a railway siding on Mr Paterson's property in 1890 to avoid having to travel miles to the nearest stations.

References 

Fraser Coast Region
Localities in Queensland